Café des Artistes was a fine restaurant at One West 67th Street in Manhattan and was owned by George Lang. He closed the restaurant for vacation at the beginning of August 2009 and, while away, then 85-year-old Lang decided to keep it closed permanently. He announced the closure on August 28, 2009. His wife, Jenifer Lang, had been the managing director of the restaurant since 1990.

History
The restaurant first opened in 1917, at street level of the Hotel des Artistes tower. Café des Artistes was designed for the residents of the Hotel des Artistes, since the apartments lacked kitchens. Artists such as Marcel Duchamp, Norman Rockwell, Isadora Duncan and Rudolph Valentino were patrons. Late in 1985, there was a fire in the kitchen, but the restaurant was able to reopen.

In early September 2009, two years into the Great Recession, Lang announced that the café was closing; shortly thereafter, Lang filed for Chapter 7 bankruptcy protection, claiming debts of nearly $500,000, some of which was owed to a union benefit trust. At the time, he also faced a lawsuit from the Hotel Employees and Restaurant Employees Union Welfare Fund.

In 2011, a new restaurant, the Leopard at des Artistes, opened in the location. According to the New York Times, it caters to those in New York society who derive "fame from power rather than the other way around".

The murals
The restaurant's famous murals, retained in the new restaurant's 2011 renovation, were painted by Howard Chandler Christy. Christy was a tenant of the building, Hotel des Artistes, until his death in 1952. There are six panels of wood nymphs, the first of which were completed in 1934. Other Christy works on display include paintings such as The Parrot Girl, The Swing Girl, Ponce De Leon, Fall, Spring, and the Fountain of Youth.

In popular culture
 1981: It is the setting for the film My Dinner with Andre. Actual filming took place in the then-unoccupied Jefferson Hotel in Richmond, Virginia.
 1986: It is the location of dinner between Kim Basinger and Mickey Rourke in the film 9½ Weeks.
 1988: In the Star Trek: The Next Generation first-season episode "We'll Always Have Paris, Captain Jean-Luc Picard visits a holographic recreation of a restaurant in 24th-century Paris that bore the same name.
 1993: It is the location of a poker lesson in the Woody Allen film Manhattan Murder Mystery.
 1994: In the Friends second-season episode "The One With The Bullies",  Monica states that she was a sous chef at the restaurant.
 1996: The film The First Wives Club used the restaurant as the location where the three women have lunch after their friend's funeral.
 2007: In the Gossip Girl first-season, Blair Waldorf states that she was supposed to have lunch here with her mother, like they used to when they were younger.

References

External links

  – The Leopard 
 At Cafe des Artistes, the Host's Enthusiasm Is Contagious

French restaurants in New York City
Defunct restaurants in New York City
1917 establishments in New York City
Companies that have filed for Chapter 7 bankruptcy
Upper West Side
Restaurants established in 1917
Restaurants disestablished in 2009
2009 disestablishments in New York (state)
Defunct French restaurants in the United States